The following is the discography of Motion City Soundtrack, an American rock band that formed in Minneapolis, Minnesota in 1997. The band's line-up consisted of vocalist and guitarist Justin Pierre, lead guitarist Joshua Cain, keyboardist Jesse Johnson, bassist Matthew Taylor, and drummer Tony Thaxton. Over the course of their nearly twenty-year career, the group toured heavily and released six studio albums, the majority on independent label Epitaph Records. The band's sound, at times described as pop punk or emo, made notable use of the Moog synthesizer.

Their first album, I Am the Movie, was originally self-released in 2002 before the group signed to Epitaph, which re-released the album in 2003. Their breakthrough album, Commit This to Memory, arrived in 2005; it achieved the highest sales in the band's discography, selling over 500,000 albums worldwide. Their third record, Even If It Kills Me (2007), also achieved commercial success. The band briefly signed to major label Columbia for their fourth album, My Dinosaur Life (2010), which represented their best performance on U.S. charts, peaking at number 15 on the Billboard 200. They rejoined Epitaph for Go in 2012 and Panic Stations in 2015, both of which represented large drop-offs in sales and chart performance. The group broke up in 2016.

The band's discography consists of consists of six studio albums, one live album, twenty singles, five extended plays, and five split EPs. The group also produced fifteen music videos, and appeared on numerous compilation albums.

Albums

Studio albums

Live albums

Extended plays

Splits

Singles

Promotional singles

Guest appearances

Music videos

See also
 List of songs recorded by Motion City Soundtrack

Notes

References

External links
 Official website
 Motion City Soundtrack at AllMusic
 

Discographies of American artists
Rock music group discographies
Pop punk group discographies